LY-379,268 is a drug that is used in neuroscience research, which acts as a potent and selective agonist for the group II metabotropic glutamate receptors (mGluR2/3).

It is derived from the older mGluR group II agonist eglumegad, and led on to the development of the more potent  compound LY-404,039, but is still widely used in research itself. LY-379,268 has sedative, neuroprotective, anti-addictive and anticonvulsant effects in animals, and blocks the effects of PCP and DOI, which has led to research into LY-379,268 and similar compounds as antipsychotic drugs for the treatment of schizophrenia in animals.

There are inconsistent findings about an additional activity as a dopamine D2 receptor partial agonist.

See also
 HYDIA

References

Eli Lilly and Company brands
MGlu2 receptor agonists
MGlu3 receptor agonists